Friars Cliff is a neighborhood and beach in Christchurch, Dorset. It is east of Mudeford and west of Highcliffe.

Beach 
Friars Cliff Beach is in the south of Christchurch, and sits on the edge of the English Channel.

Services 
The area was formerly served by Pinebeach Nursing Home. The building has been derelict since December 2015

Politics 
Friars Cliff is part of the Christchurch parliamentary constituency for elections to the House of Commons. It is currently represented by Conservative MP Christopher Chope.

Friars Cliff is also part of the Mudeford, Stanpit and West Highcliffe wards for elections to Bournemouth, Christchurch and Poole Council.

Since 2019, Friars Cliff has elected two councillors to Christchurch Town Council.

References 

Areas of Christchurch, Dorset
Beaches of Dorset